Živinice is a city located in Tuzla Canton of the Federation of Bosnia and Herzegovina, an entity of Bosnia and Herzegovina. It is located in northeastern Bosnia and Herzegovina, south of Tuzla. As of 2013, it has a population of 57,765 inhabitants.

History 
In the 7th century, Slavic tribes settled permanently in the area of the town of Živinice. The medieval territory of Živinice was part of the Bosnian state, the areas of Gostilj, Dramešin and Soli as independent political units that lost those attributes until the arrival of the Ottomans in Bosnia. The settlement of Živinice as an urban location probably originated in the 18th century.

Općina Živinice was formed on 19. June 1959, after a decision by the National Assembly of the People's Republic of Bosnia and Herzegovina was passed.

The origin of the name Živinice is still not established. According to historian Muhamed Hadžijahić Živinice was mentioned in a Turkish document of 1764 as "Živinice called Uskopči, probably (Oskovci) in nahiya Tuzla".

Demographics

1991 
In the 1991 census, the municipality of Živinice had 54,783 inhabitants, of which there were:
44,017 Bosniaks (80.34%)
3,976 Croats (7.25%)
3,525 Serbs (6.43%)
2,130 Yugoslavs (3.88%)
and 1,135 others or unknown (2.07%)

The town of Živinice itself had 11,956 residents. By the last documents, Živinice had 12,102 residents.

2022 Census 

Page text.

Sport 
NK Slaven Živinice
KK Živinice
KK Spartans

Općina Živinice 

Bašigovci, Brnjica, Djedino, Dubrave Donje, Dubrave Gornje, Dunajevići, Đurđevik, Gračanica, Kovači, Kršići, Kuljan, Lukavica Donja, Lukavica Gornja, Odorovići, Strašanj, Priluk, Spreča, Suha, Svojat, Šarenjak – Hornica, Šerići, Tupković Donji, Tupković Gornji, Višća Donja, Višća Gornja, Vrnojevići, Zelenika, Zukići, Živinice Gornje, Brcanine, Šišici, Mestrici, Zenuni.

Notable residents 
Boris Živković, Croatian footballer
Dragan Perić, Serbian athlete, World Championships bronze medalist
Denijal Pirić, retired footballer
Elvir Rahimić, footballer
Jasmin Fejzić, football goalkeeper
Mirsad Bešlija, footballer
Tomislav Tadić, philosopher, University professor
Jusuf Nurkić, basketball player
Samir Memišević, footballer
Adnan Babajić, singer, the winner of talents show Operacija trijumf
Gordana Tadić, chief state prosecutor

Monuments 

Statue of Josip Broz Tito
Monument to dead fighters of Bosnian War

Education 
Živinice has nine elementary schools and two high schools.

References 

 Official results from the book: Ethnic composition of Bosnia-Herzegovina population, by municipalities and settlements, 1991. census, Zavod za statistiku Bosne i Hercegovine – Bilten no.234, Sarajevo 1991.

Notes

External links 

 http://www.zivinice.ba
 http://www.opcinazivinice.org/
 http://www.zivinice-carsija.com/

 
Populated places in Živinice
Cities and towns in the Federation of Bosnia and Herzegovina